The 1962 French Championships (now known as the French Open) was a tennis tournament that took place on the outdoor clay courts at the Stade Roland-Garros in Paris, France. The tournament ran from 21 May until 2 June. It was the 66th staging of the French Championships, and the second Grand Slam tennis event of 1962. Rod Laver and Margaret Smith won the singles titles.

Finals

Men's singles

 Rod Laver defeated  Roy Emerson 3–6, 2–6, 6–3, 9–7, 6–2

Women's singles

 Margaret Smith defeated  Lesley Turner 6–3, 3–6, 7–5

Men's doubles

 Roy Emerson /   Neale Fraser defeated  Wilhelm Bungert /  Christian Kuhnke 6–3, 6–4, 7–5

Women's doubles

 Sandra Price  /  Renée Schuurman defeated  Justina Bricka / Margaret Smith 6–4, 6–4

Mixed doubles

 Renée Schuurman /  Bob Howe defeated  Lesley Turner /  Fred Stolle 3–6, 6–4, 6–4

References

External links
 French Open official website

French Championships
French Championships (tennis) by year
French Champ
French Championships (tennis)
French Championships (tennis)
French Championships (tennis)